St. Andrew's Presbyterian Church of Temperley (Spanish: Iglesia Presbiteriana San Andrés de Temperley) is a temple of Presbyterian religion, located in the "barrio inglés" of Temperley, southern part of the Greater Buenos Aires.

History 
Established in 1913, this church was originally conceived to house the large number of British residents of the area, mostly Protestant. It was made by the work of the English architects, 
Walter Bassett Smith and Bertie Hawkins Collcutt, who started the works in 1911.

St. Andrew's  Presbyterian Church of Temperley was declared as historical heritage of Argentina in 2018.

References 

Churches in Buenos Aires Province
Churches in Argentina
20th-century Presbyterian churches
Christianity in Buenos Aires